This article is about the history of Saturday Night Live from 2010 through 2015.

2010–2011 season

The 2010–11 season of Saturday Night Live began September 25, 2010 with host Amy Poehler and musical guest Katy Perry. Before the start of the new season, four new cast members were added to fill the gap left behind by Will Forte (who quit the show after eight years), Jenny Slate (who was fired after her first season on the show), Abby Elliott (who was promoted to repertory player), and Bobby Moynihan (also promoted). The four new hires were improv comedians Paul Brittain and Vanessa Bayer, former MADtv and The Amanda Show cast member Taran Killam, and stand-up comic and impressionist Jay Pharoah. Second-year cast member Nasim Pedrad stayed a featured player for this season.

Cast

Fred Armisen
Abby Elliott
Bill Hader
Seth Meyers
Bobby Moynihan
Andy Samberg
Jason Sudeikis
Kenan Thompson
Kristen Wiig

Featuring
 Vanessa Bayer
 Paul Brittain
 Taran Killam
 Nasim Pedrad
 Jay Pharoah

Notes
Will Forte, who had been with the show since 2002 and completed 8 seasons, announced on August 26, 2010 that he would be leaving the show. Featured player Jenny Slate was let go from the show after only one season.
Abby Elliott and Bobby Moynihan were promoted to repertory status, becoming the first featured players to be promoted since the 2006–07 season.
The show hired four new cast members: Chicago improv comedians Vanessa Bayer and Paul Brittain; stand-up comic/impressionist Jay Pharoah; and comedic actor Taran Killam of The Groundlings. Killam became the second actor to have been a cast member on both MADtv and SNL, the first being Jeff Richards who joined SNL in 2001 and departed in early 2004.
Former cast member Amy Poehler hosted the season premiere. Poehler was the fourth female former cast member of SNL to return as a host, the third to have worked under Lorne Michaels, and the second one to have been a Weekend Update anchor. She was also the 26th former cast member to return to host.
With this season, Jeff Bridges surpassed Sigourney Weaver's record for longest gap between hosting appearances (Weaver's gap was 24 years between her first appearance in 1986 and her second appearance in 2010; Bridges has a 27-year gap between his first appearance in 1983 and his second appearance in 2010).

2011–2012 season

The 2011–12 season of Saturday Night Live premiered on September 24, 2011, with host Alec Baldwin and musical guest Radiohead.

Cast

Fred Armisen 
Abby Elliott
Bill Hader
Seth Meyers
Bobby Moynihan
Nasim Pedrad
Andy Samberg
Jason Sudeikis
Kenan Thompson
Kristen Wiig

Featuring
 Vanessa Bayer
 Paul Brittain (final episode: January 14, 2012)
 Taran Killam
 Kate McKinnon (first episode: April 7, 2012)
 Jay Pharoah

Notes
 Featured player Kate McKinnon (a former cast member on Logo's The Big Gay Sketch Show) joins mid-season, making her first appearance in April, on the episode hosted by Sofia Vergara. McKinnon is SNL'''s first openly gay female cast member, the third lesbian cast member hired (after Denny Dillon in 1980, though she wasn't open when she was on the show, and  Danitra Vance in 1985, though Vance's sexual orientation wasn't known until she died in 1994), the second cast member hired to be openly gay (after Terry Sweeney, who like Danitra Vance, was also from the 1985–86 season), and the second white lesbian cast member hired (after Denny Dillon). McKinnon is also the first cast member from The Big Gay Sketch Show to be a cast member on SNL (and the second cast member from The Big Gay Sketch Show to cross over to a mainstream sketch comedy show. Erica Ash, from MADtv's 14th and final season on FOX, is the first).

2012–2013 season

The 2012–13 season of Saturday Night Live premiered on September 15, 2012, with host Seth MacFarlane and musical guest Frank Ocean.

Cast

Fred Armisen
Vanessa Bayer
Bill Hader
Taran Killam
Seth Meyers
Bobby Moynihan
Nasim Pedrad
Jay Pharoah
Jason Sudeikis
Kenan ThompsonFeaturingAidy Bryant
Kate McKinnon
Tim Robinson
Cecily Strong

2013–2014 season

The 2013–14 season of Saturday Night Live premiered on September 28, 2013, with host Tina Fey and musical guest Arcade Fire.

Cast

Vanessa Bayer
Aidy Bryant
Taran Killam
Kate McKinnon
Seth Meyers (final episode: February 1, 2014)
Bobby Moynihan
Nasim Pedrad
Jay Pharoah
Cecily Strong
Kenan ThompsonFeaturingBeck Bennett
Colin Jost (first episode: March 1, 2014)
John Milhiser
Kyle Mooney
Mike O'Brien
Noël Wells
Brooks Wheelan
Sasheer Zamata (first episode: January 18, 2014)

Notes
On May 12, 2013, NBC announced that Weekend Update anchor Seth Meyers (who had been a cast member since 2001, and Weekend Update anchor since 2006), would be the new host of Late Night in 2014, succeeding Jimmy Fallon as he takes over as the new host of The Tonight Show. Meyers remained as Update anchor for the first half of the season, then left in February 2014, to host his incarnation of Late Night. On September 16, 2013, it was announced that Cecily Strong would be Meyers' co-anchor on Weekend Update.
Six new cast members have been hired, Upright Citizens Brigade performers Beck Bennett, John Milhiser, Kyle Mooney, and Noël Wells, stand-up comedian Brooks Wheelan (who originally was hired as a writer until Tim Robinson was chosen instead), and four-year writer Michael Patrick O'Brien (credited as "Mike O'Brien"). This is the highest number of cast members hired since season 21 (1995–96) and, with the addition of Sasheer Zamata, this season has the most female cast members with seven, surpassing the number of six in the 1991–92 (season 17) cast.

2014–2015 season

The 2014–15 season of Saturday Night Live premiered on September 27, 2014, with host Chris Pratt and musical guest Ariana Grande.

Cast

Vanessa Bayer
Aidy Bryant
Taran Killam
Kate McKinnon
Bobby Moynihan
Jay Pharoah
Cecily Strong
Kenan ThompsonFeaturingBeck Bennett
Michael Che
Pete Davidson
Leslie Jones (first episode: October 25, 2014)
Colin Jost
Kyle Mooney
Sasheer Zamata

Notes
Former writer Michael Che, returns to SNL to co-anchor Weekend Update, replacing Cecily Strong, who remains on the show. Che had initially left the show at the end of last season to be a correspondent on The Daily Show with Jon Stewart''.

References

2010
2010s in American television
Saturday Night Live in the 2010s